Luciano Lamonarca (born 11 August 1978) is an Italian opera singer, crossover artist, keynote speaker, philanthropist, and event producer. He has performed under the patronage and auspices of the United Nations, UNESCO, the European Union, the Presidency of the Italian Republic, and the Italian Ministry of Foreign Affairs. Venues in which he has performed include the United Nations General Assembly, Lincoln Center, Carnegie Hall, Madison Square Garden, Liechtenstein Museum in Vienna, and Teatro Politeama in Palermo. Having performed in more than 200 benefit events from 2008 to 2018, his involvement in numerous charitable causes, and his commitment to making art with a purpose have earned Luciano Lamonarca the sobriquet "The Goodwill Tenor."

Personal life and education
Luciano Lamonarca was born in Milan, as the second and youngest son of Pasquale Lamonarca and Anna De Nicolo. His family later moved to Ruvo di Puglia in the southern Province of Bari where he began his musical education. Originally trained as a clarinetist, at age 18 he became devoted to opera after hearing a recording of Mario Del Monaco’s rendition of Un Amore Così Grande. From 1998 to 2008, he participated in several master classes conducted by Salvatore Fisichella, Roberto Scandiuzzi and Daniele Barioni, and he studied with Gino Lo Risso-Toma, Carmen Sensaud, and Ignazio Campisi. In 2008, he moved to the United States.

Artistic accomplishments
In 2008, he appeared twice in April. The first performance was at New York's Madison Square Garden for the opening of the worldwide premiere of the movie Carnera: The Walking Mountain. Among the honored guests at that occasion were the American Actor Burt Young and the Academy Award Winner F. Murray Abraham. Only a few days later, he performed again as a European representative in a concert held at the United Nations General Assembly where he sang before an audience of ambassadors; delegations; the President of the 62nd Session of the General Assembly, H.E. Srgian Kerim; and Secretary-General Ban Ki-moon. Later in that same year, he performed with I Solisti del Teatro Regio di Parma at the Public Service Awards Ceremony, organized by the Department of Public Administration of the United Nations.

In March 2009, he performed in a concert, titled "Mamma," at New York's Merkin Concert Hall. Then in 2010 he performed at New York's Lincoln Center for the Performing Arts for a concert in honor of tenor Giovanni Consiglio and again in December when he sang at Carnegie Hall in a concert-tribute to the United Nations Department of Peacekeeping Operations.

In 2011 at the Tenth Anniversary of the Attack on the Twin Towers in Westchester County (New York), his featured performance was broadcast by News 12. In November of the same year, he was again the featured performer at "United Academia," a concert celebrating the first anniversary of United Nations Academic Impact.

In 2013, he returned to Merkin Concert Hall as a special performing guest of the United Nations Symphony Orchestra. In May, he performed for the first time in Chisinau, Moldova, at the prestigious Sala Cu Orga in a benefit concert, titled Sing for You, in support of the Regina Pacis Foundation.

From 2014 to 2017, he invested his energy and time in performing in multiple concerts and events in support of the Saint Pio Foundation. On December 7, 2018, he returned to Carnegie Hall where he performed with the Four Phantoms (Brent Barrett, Ciarán Sheehan, Franc D'Ambrosio, and Marcus Lovett).

Albums and digital projects
In March 2009 Luciano Lamonarca released his first album, titled Mamma, dedicated to his mother and launched in a concert at Merkin Concert Hall in New York.

In January 2012, he released his second album The Impossible Dream, a compilation of Italian operatic arias and American pop-operatic hits, made in partnership with the New York Choral Society. In October of the same year and with the approval of stage director Giancarlo Del Monaco, he produced the online music project Ricordano Mario Del Monaco as a tribute to the legendary tenor Mario Del Monaco.

In May 2018, he recorded the single God Bless America in partnership with the National Catholic Prayer Breakfast on the occasion of the 100th anniversary of its composition by Irving Berlin. Later that year in October, he recorded the single Volare on the 60th anniversary of its composition by Domenico Modugno.

Media credits
Luciano Lamonarca has been interviewed and featured in numerous articles and television interviews by The New York Times, The Wall Street Journal, New York Daily News, New York Post, Fox News, NBC, CBS, News 12, RAI Uno, RAI Tre, RAI International, The Italian Times, The Italian Tribune, Italia! magazine (in Russian), La Repubblica, America Oggi, Quotidiano.Net, and Il Corriere del Mezzogiorno.

Public recognition
Luciano Lamonarca received a Proclamation for artistic merit from the Westchester County Executive, Hon. Robert Astorino, on October 7, 2013, and from the New York State Comptroller, Hon. Thomas DiNapoli, on October 24, 2013.

Philanthropy and the sobriquet "The Goodwill Tenor"
Because of his involvement in numerous charitable causes, his commitment to making art with a purpose, and having performed in more than two hundred benefit events in the span of a decade, Luciano Lamonarca was nicknamed The Goodwill Tenor. Part of the proceeds from the sales of his first album Mamma in 2009 was donated to the City of Hope in Zambia, a missionary project by Salesian Nuns to help orphan girls and victims of sexual abuse and domestic violence. A portion of the proceeds from his 2012 album The Impossible Dream was donated to the Mini Maestros Program, which enabled New York City public school students and their parents to attend New York Choral Society performances at Carnegie Hall at no cost.

He initiated, organized and performed in United for Abruzzo, an artistic tour of Manhattan, Staten Island, and Pennsylvania that raised funds for the victims of the earthquake in Abruzzo in 2009.
 In the spring of 2011 he introduced two philanthropic projects. The first, An Evening of Italian Opera Arias, was a gift of voice for cancer patients, families,  and friends and a show of support for Musculoskeletal Cancer Research at Wintergarden and for Morgan Stanley Children's Hospital, at Columbia University Medical Center. The second was the Concert Luciano Lamonarca and Friends,  in April 2011, at Victor Borge Hall at the Scandinavia House, benefiting  the Wyckoff Heights Medical Center.

Luciano Lamonarca has created and performed in numerous other artistic-philanthropic projects to benefit orphans and the poor from various communities in the United States and is a proud supporter of charity and Catholic organizations.

Puglia Center of America
In November 2009, moved by his passion for Apulia, his homeland, Luciano Lamonarca founded the Puglia Center of America, a premiere organization for the promotion of the Apulia region of Italy in all its aspects. The Puglia Center of America fostered the creation and exchange of cultural, tourist, and educational assets between the Apulia region of Italy and the United States.  Other goals and projects included the support of global social objectives, as well as missionary and humanitarian projects aimed at fighting cancer.

Through the Puglia Center of America, Luciano produced the December 2010 concert United for Peace, at Carnegie Hall, as a tribute to the United Nations Department of Peacekeeping Operations and the United Nations Logistics Base located in Brindisi, Apulia.

In 2012, he built working relationships with dignitaries at the highest levels, international officials, academicians, and celebrities and successfully negotiated joint declarations of cooperation between Westchester County (New York) and the Province of Bari and between the State of Connecticut and the Province of Bari. In his capacity as President of the Puglia Center of America, Mr. Lamonarca was a co-signer of those declarations of cooperation.

Among other civil society projects related to the United Nations, the organization launched the project United Academia, an initiative whose goal was to create international partnerships in the academic field and to extend access and membership in United Nations Academic Impact ("UNAI"). Through this initiative, six academic institutions joined UNAI - Fordham University, Hofstra University, and the John D. Calandra Italian American Institute from the United States and University of Bari Aldo Moro, Politecnico of Bari and the University of Salento of Lecce from Italy.

As the keynote speaker at the University of Bari Aldo Moro, Maestro Lamonarca, in his capacity as President of the Puglia Center of America, shared the platform with Mr. Kiyo Akasaka, Under Secretary of the United Nations Department of Public Information, at the symposium "On the Road to Rio - Making development sustainable."

Saint Pio Foundation
Luciano Lamonarca is a Catholic who has lent his personal support to promoting charitable causes in the United States, Europe, and Latin America. Because of his admiration for Padre Pio and having received the saint's intercession, he founded and assumed the role of President and CEO of the Saint Pio Foundation. The Saint Pio Foundation is an American charitable organization whose mission is to promote awareness of Saint Pio and his charism nationally and internationally. It achieves its mission by working with individuals and American Catholic healthcare, education, social, religious, and cultural partner organizations that use their facilities and influence to advance the public's knowledge of the legacy and importance of Saint Pio.

Personal life 
In May 2010, he married Valentina Popa, whom he met immediately after his performance at the United Nations General Assembly on April 15, 2008. Their son, Nicholas Sebastian, was named after Nicholas Nubile, whom Luciano regarded as his "adoptive" father during his first years in the United States.

External links
Luciano Lamonarca website
Puglia Center of America
Saint Pio Foundation

References

1978 births
Living people
Italian opera singers
Italian philanthropists
Musicians from New Rochelle, New York
21st-century Italian singers